As Canções de Eu Tu Eles is an album released by Brazilian singer-songwriter Gilberto Gil in 2001. The album is the soundtrack for the 2000 film Eu Tu Eles directed by Andrucha Waddington, starred by Regina Casé, Lima Duarte, Stênio Garcia and Luiz Carlos Vasconcelos. Set in Russas, the film is about a countywoman who lives together with her three husbands and two children in the arid backlands of the northeast of Brazil. At the 2000 Cannes Film Festival it earned a "Special Distinction" in the Un Certain Regard section.

Waddington asked Gil to record the album, which also became Gil's tribute to Luiz Gonzaga "The King of the Baião", recording songs previously released by Gonzaga, such as "Assum Preto," "Asa Branca," "Juazeiro," and "Qui Nem Jiló". Gil also wrote songs especially for this movie soundtrack, "As Pegadas do Amor" and "Lamento Sertanejo". The first single released, "Esperando Na Janela", became a hit in Brazil in 2000. There is also a song recorded by Gil on his album Dia Dorim, Noite Neon (1995), "Casinha Feliz", that is recreated and closes the album, which was recorded in ten days.

The album was named by Phillip Jandovský of Allmusic one of Gil's best since the 1970s and a "very authentic and down-to-earth tribute to the old masters of the popular music of the Brazilian Northeast region." Alvaro Neder, also of Allmusic, referred to the music on the album as "delicious", with the songs "filled with the genuine soul of the suffering northeast." As Canções de Eu Tu Eles received a Latin Grammy Award nomination for Album of the Year and was awarded for Best Brazilian Roots/Regional Album. The song "Esperando Na Janela" earned the Latin Grammy for Best Brazilian Song and was nominated for Record of the Year.

Track listing
This information adapted from Allmusic.

 The nomination was shared with Vitor Farias, Marcelo Machado and Nas Nuvens (engineers/mixers).

Certification

References 

2000 soundtrack albums
Gilberto Gil soundtracks
Portuguese-language soundtracks
Latin Grammy Award for Best Portuguese Language Roots Album